The AMT Hardballer is a series of pistols that are part of the 1911 platform (based on the .45 ACP M1911) made by Arcadia Machine & Tool (AMT) from 1977 to 2002. The Hardballer was the first entirely stainless steel 1911 pattern pistol. Other features included adjustable rear sights and a lengthened grip safety.

Overview
The Hardballer derives its name from round-nose hardball G.I. ammunition
(solid 230 grain Full Metal Jacketed bullets). This is the round the
pistol was designed to shoot.

The Hardballer series of pistols all share a brushed
stainless steel finish and a wide target style trigger with adjustable
trigger stop. The later Galena-made pistols have an elongated
"beavertail" grip safety and a beveled magazine well.

Variants
 AMT Hardballer: an all stainless steel version of the Colt Gold Cup, fitted with Micro rear sights.
 AMT Combat Government: was developed as a sports pistol but in 1978 AMT marketed the Combat Government, an M1911 clone with fixed sights for police departments. Since 1985, this model has been called the Government with the term "Combat" omitted.
 AMT Longslide: a version with an extended  barrel, introduced in 1980.
 AMT Skipper: a compact version of the Hardballer introduced in 1980. It features a  barrel. In 1984, the Skipper disappeared from AMT's range.
 AMT Commando: originally offered by AMT then improved and reintroduced in 2000 (this date in question) under the Galena Industries brand. The original AMT Commando was a  barreled version and did not have a loaded chamber indicator nor beavertail grip safety. The improved Commando is a compact model of the  Government with a  barrel but retaining the frame of the Government model. It is chambered in .40 S&W and has an 8-round magazine capacity.
 AMT Accelerator: a Galena-made Longslide chambered for the .400 Corbon cartridge featuring a  barrel and an elongated beavertail.
 AMT Javelina: a variant chambered in the 10mm Auto caliber with an 8-round capacity magazine, available both as a standard and longslide version.

In popular culture

A longslide version of the Hardballer with a top-mounted helium-neon laser sight was used by Arnold Schwarzenegger's Terminator character in the 1984 film, The Terminator.

References

External links

 AMT Hardballer Owners manuals
 Ian's AMT Information site

.45 ACP semi-automatic pistols
1911 platform
AMT semi-automatic pistols
Short recoil firearms
Semi-automatic pistols of the United States